Pakistan Television cricket team was a first-class cricket team sponsored by the Pakistan Television Corporation. They competed in Pakistan's first-class, List A and Twenty20 tournaments between the 2010-11 and 2018-19 seasons.

After playing for some seasons in the non-first-class grades of the Patron's Trophy, Pakistan Television were promoted to first-class status to play in the Quaid-e-Azam Trophy in the 2010–11 season. They played 9 matches, winning 3, losing 2 and drawing 4, and finished sixth out of 10 teams in Division Two. Awais Zia hit their highest score of 232 (out of a team total of 426) against State Bank of Pakistan.

They returned to non-first-class status in 2011–12. They won the final in Grade Two of the Patron's Trophy in 2012–13, and resumed at first-class level in 2013–14 in the top level of the Patron's Trophy, but they finished last out of eleven, with 2 wins, 7 losses and a draw. They also finished last in the President's Cup One-Day Tournament, with 2 wins and 8 losses.

They lost their first-class status in 2014, but regained it in 2017, and returned to the Quaid-e-Azam Trophy for the 2017–18 tournament. In November 2017, in round 7 of the tournament, they were bowled out for 37 runs in their second innings against Khan Research Laboratories. This was the fifth-lowest total in the history of the Quaid-e-Azam Trophy. In all, Pakistan Television played 40 first-class matches between October 2010 and October 2018.

In May 2019, Pakistan's Prime Minister Imran Khan revamped the domestic cricket structure in Pakistan, excluding departmental teams like Pakistan Television in favour of regional sides, therefore ending the participation of the team. The Pakistan Cricket Board (PCB) was criticised in removing departmental sides, with players voicing their concern to revive the teams.

References

External links
 Lists of matches played by Pakistan Television

Pakistani first-class cricket teams